Brigitte Raue is a retired German rower who won a bronze and a silver medal in the quad sculls at the European championships of 1957 and 1958, respectively.

References

Year of birth missing (living people)
Living people
East German female rowers
European Rowing Championships medalists